ishQ Bector (born 3 June 1982) is an Indo Canadian composer, music producer, singer, songwriter, actor, director and Hip Hop artist. He is best known for his hit song "Aye Hip-Hopper" in which he collaborated with Sunidhi Chauhan. Recently, ishQ has composed and featured in the song "Har Gham Mein Khushi Hai" from the Bollywood film "Gully Boy". He's got full-length albums, corporate campaigns with "Amazon", "Netflix", "Flipkart" and "McDowells", background scores, commercials and Bollywood tracks to back-up his career thus far.  He has featured in many Bollywood music videos such as "Karle Gunna - Ugly Aur Pagli", and "Harrys not a Bramachari - Shaadi ke side effects”.

ishQ is managed by AR Rahman, Shekhar Kapoor and Samir Bangara's digital company called Qyuki Digital Media.  He works closely with the “After School of Hip-Hop”, a school in Mumbai’s Dharavi slums dedicated to providing underprivileged children with an opportunity to develop their musical talents. Dharavi is the largest slum in all of Asia.  ishQ has directed a music video “Naach Na Shaane” for the kids of Dharavi which was very well received.

As a music composer, ishQ has given songs like Ranbir Kapoor's "Besharam" Title Track and the hit "Fukrey Returns".  ishQ has also done background scores for movies like Zee5's “377 - Abh Normal", the entire AR Rahman and Shah Rukh Khan’s “ARRived” YouTube Original's singing reality series and both seasons of a Horror series called "Shockers" by Hotstar.

Beginnings
Born and raised in Winnipeg, Manitoba, ishQ has Punjabi roots and went to a French Immersion school. As a teenager, he was part of an underground Canadian Hip Hop group - Frek Sho,. ishQ studied acting at the Roshan Taneja film studio and Madhumathi's Academy in Mumbai.  He first exploded into the global Desi scene with his hit album "Dakku Daddy". The first single being "Aye Hip Hopper" which now has cult status for Indian Hip Hop. Audiences got to know ishQ's zany personality further through hit TV series “Iss Jungle se Mujhe Bachao!” (the Indian version of “I’m a Celebrity, Get Me Out Of Here!”) and Vjing shows for MTV India, Channel V and B4U.

Television career
In addition to his acting career, IshQ has also hosted shows on Channel V, MTV and B4U. He has also been a participant of the reality TV show- Iss Jungle Se Mujhe Bachao. The show is a concept of the British reality show-I'm a Celebrity...Get Me Out of Here! (UK TV series). He has also starred in the TV series " Bollywood Hero" in the role of Girish.

Music
IshQ has produced written and sung music for movies like Shaadi Ke Side Effects, Besharam, Pyaar Ke Side Effects, Dhoom 2, Fight Club, Race, Mission Istanbul, Hello, Ugly Aur Pagli and Allah Ke Banday. Latest, he has sung the title song for Ranbir Kapoor starrer film "Besharam".He has also composed music for the TV series Travel India and Culture Shock. IshQ has also performed with known international artists such as Sean Paul, Rishi Rich, John Cena .

His singles constitute Aye Hip Hopper, Daaku Daddy, Ishq De , Miss You, Bum Bum Bo! Dirty ishQ, Chaand Sitare.

His Saali Bitch, the single, was released online due to censor regulations .

His single Bum Bum Bo!, released online on YouTube

As a playback singer

As music director

As lyricist

References

External links
 https://www.youtube.com/user/ishqbector – Ishq Bector YouTube
 https://archive.today/20121202011441/http://in.linkedin.com/pub/ishq-bector/56/2b5/5a2

21st-century Canadian rappers
Bollywood playback singers
Punjabi people
1982 births
Living people
Musicians from Winnipeg
Canadian people of Indian descent
Canadian male rappers
21st-century Canadian male musicians